Chad Bruce Hermansen (born September 10, 1977) is a former Major League Baseball outfielder.

Career
Hermansen played amateur ball as a shortstop at Green Valley High School of Henderson, Nevada, and the Pittsburgh Pirates selected him in the first round of the June draft, with the tenth overall pick. After signing with the Pirates, Hermansen immediately emerged as a top prospect. He earned a promotion to the major leagues at the end of that season, and made his debut against the San Diego Padres on September 7, 1999.

He spent parts of the next three seasons bouncing back and forth between the Pirates and Triple-A, and then was traded to the Chicago Cubs for Darren Lewis on July 31, 2002. Lewis chose to retire rather than report to the Pirates, so the teams made a follow-up trade involving minor league players Aron Weston, Ricardo Palma, and Tim Lavery two weeks later. Hermansen spent the remainder of the season with the Cubs, and then was traded to the Los Angeles Dodgers on December 4. The Cubs received Eric Karros and Mark Grudzielanek, while the Dodgers also received Todd Hundley.

He next signed with the Elmira Pioneers, but played in no games before being signed by the San Diego Padres organization. The Padres immediately released Hermansen, however, citing arm problems as their concern. In , Hermansen played for the Sioux Falls Canaries of the newly formed American Association.

Hermansen began the  season playing for the Albuquerque Isotopes, the Triple-A affiliate of the Florida Marlins, though he was not on the Marlins' 40-man roster. He was acquired by the New York Mets on August 7 for a player to be named later. Hermansen signed a minor league contract with the Los Angeles Angels of Anaheim during the 07-08 offseason, but was released during spring training.

Hermansen is now an instructor at the Frozen Ropes Training Center in Henderson, NV. He is a member of the Latter-day Saint church and is married with 3 children, and one on the way. He also works for the NCSA (the National Collegiate Scouting Association).  As of the  season, he is an area scout for the Angels.

References

External links

1977 births
Living people
Albuquerque Isotopes players
American expatriate baseball players in Canada
Augusta GreenJackets players
Baseball players from Salt Lake City
Carolina Mudcats players
Chicago Cubs players
Erie SeaWolves players
Green Valley High School (Nevada) alumni
Gulf Coast Pirates players
Las Vegas 51s players
Los Angeles Angels scouts
Los Angeles Angels of Anaheim scouts
Los Angeles Dodgers players
Lynchburg Hillcats players
Major League Baseball center fielders
Nashville Sounds players
New Orleans Zephyrs players
Pittsburgh Pirates players
Sioux Falls Canaries players
Sportspeople from Salt Lake City
Syracuse SkyChiefs players
Toronto Blue Jays players
Vero Beach Dodgers players